Tanarctus is a genus of tardigrades in the family Tanarctidae, named and described by Jeanne Renaud-Debyser in 1959.

Species
The genus includes 13 species:
 Tanarctus arborspinosus Lindgren, 1971
 Tanarctus bubulubus Jørgensen & Kristensen, 2001
 Tanarctus dendriticus Renaud-Mornant, 1980
 Tanarctus diplocerus Fujimoto, Miyazaki & Suzuki, 2013
 Tanarctus gracilis Renaud-Mornant, 1980
 Tanarctus helleouetae Renaud-Mornant, 1984
 Tanarctus heterodactylus Renaud-Mornant, 1980
 Tanarctus hirsutospinosus Jørgensen, Boesgaard, Møbjerg & Kristensen, 2014
 Tanarctus longisetosus Grimaldi de Zio, D'Addabbo Gallo, Morone De Lucia, Vaccarella & Grimaldi, 1982
 Tanarctus minotauricus Renaud-Mornant, 1984
 Tanarctus ramazzottii Renaud-Mornant, 1975
 Tanarctus tauricus Renaud-Debyser, 1959 - type species
 Tanarctus velatus McKirdy, Schmidt & McGinty-Bayly, 1976

References

Further reading
 Renaud-Debyser, 1959 : Études sur la faune interstitielle des îles Bahamas. III. Tardigrades. (Studies on Interstitial Fauna in the Bahamas: III: Tardigrades) Vie et Milieu, vol. 10, p. 296-302.

Tardigrade genera
Arthrotardigrada